The 1973 Manitoba general election was held on June 28, 1973 to elect Members of the Legislative Assembly of the Province of Manitoba, Canada.  It was won by the social-democratic New Democratic Party, which took 31 of 57 seats to win government in its own right for the first time.  The Progressive Conservative Party finished second with 21, while the Manitoba Liberal Party took the remaining five. The Manitoba Social Credit Party lost its only seat.

A right-of-centre municipal organization known as the Independent Citizens' Election Committee convinced the Progressive Conservative and Liberal parties to avoid competing against each other in certain Winnipeg-area ridings, such that a single "anti-socialist" alternative to the NDP could be offered.  This campaign was generally unsuccessful.

Results

Note:

* Party did not nominate candidates in previous election.

Riding results

Party key:
PC:  Progressive Conservative Party of Manitoba 
L:  Manitoba Liberal Party 
NDP:  New Democratic Party of Manitoba 
SC:  Manitoba Social Credit Party 
Comm:  Communist Party of Canada - Manitoba 
(M-L): Communist Party of Canada – Marxist-Leninist
Ind:  Independent

Arthur:
(incumbent)Douglas Watt (PC) 3487
Lorne Watt (NDP) 1981
M.F. Mac Corbett (L) 1181

Assiniboia:
(incumbent)Stephen Patrick (L) 5105
Norma Price (PC) 4309
Larry Iwan (NDP) 3029

Birtle-Russell:
(incumbent)Harry Graham (PC) 3203
Michael Sotas (NDP) 2967
John Braendle (L) 685

Brandon East:
(incumbent)Leonard Evans (NDP) 4123
Ken Burgess (PC) 2912
Terry Penton (L) 855
John Gross (SC) 78

Brandon West:
(incumbent)Edward McGill (PC) 5070
Henry Carroll (NDP) 4028
Guy Savoie (L) 806

Burrows:
(incumbent)Ben Hanuschak (NDP) 5277
Doug Krochak (PC) 1044
Bob Major (L) 741
Mary Kardash (Comm) 108
Glen Brown (M-L) 33

Charleswood:
(incumbent)Arthur Moug (PC) 6180
Roy Neil Benson (NDP) 3554
Jim Spencer (L) 3456

Churchill:
Les Osland (NDP) 2041
Andy Champagne (PC) 1367
Walter Perepeluk (L) 1256
Andrew Kirkness (Ind) 880

Crescentwood:
Harvey Patterson (NDP) 3730
Lawrie Pollard (PC) 3729
June Menzies (L) 1734

Dauphin:
(incumbent)Peter Burtniak (NDP) 4261
Art Rampton (PC) 3262
Hugh Dunlop (L) 1091

Elmwood:
(incumbent)Russell Doern (NDP) 4987
Edward Tymchuk (PC) 2361
Ray Brunka (L) 1363

Emerson:
Steve Derewianchuk (NDP) 2374
Garnet Kyle (PC) 1937
Mark Smerchanski (L) 1768
Walter Hoover (Ind) 83

Flin Flon:
(incumbent)Thomas Barrow (NDP) 3112
George Njegovan (PC) 1803
Roy Veness (L) 893

Fort Garry:
(incumbent)L.R. Bud Sherman (PC) 4783
Henry Janzen (L) 4331
C.G. Gifford (NDP) 4006

Fort Rouge:
Lloyd Axworthy (L) 4181
Samia Friesen (NDP) 3614
(incumbent)Inez Trueman (PC) 3531
Lane McDonald (Ind) 131

Gimli:
(incumbent)John Gottfried (NDP) 3546
Ted Revel (PC) 3490
Charles Arnason (Ind) 164

Gladstone:
(incumbent)James Ferguson (PC) 3605
Gordon Stewart (NDP) 2394
Gordon McPhail (L) 1698
Kenneth Morrison (Ind) 106

Inkster:
(incumbent)Sidney Green (NDP) 5442
John Sulymko (L) 1686
Joe McMullen (PC) 1622
Don Currie (Comm) 78
Aili Waldman (M-L) 12

Kildonan:
(incumbent)Peter Fox (NDP) 5718
Don Lynn Heidman (PC) 2660
Ann McTavish (L) 2097

Lac Du Bonnet:
(incumbent)Samuel Uskiw (NDP) 5461
Jo Anne Hillier (L) 2244

Lakeside:
(incumbent)Harry Enns (PC) 2969  
George Schreyer (NDP) 1793
Alan Beachell (L) 1778

La Verendrye:
Robert Banman (PC) 2912
(incumbent)Leonard Barkman (L) 2387
Roger Smith (NDP) 1514

Logan:
(incumbent)William Jenkins (NDP) 2671
Rita Servin (PC) 1582
Andrew Mazur (L) 644
William Hawryluk (Ind) 671
Gordon Anderson (Ind) 48

Minnedosa:
(incumbent)Dave Blake (PC) 3777
Lawrence Bell (NDP) 2708
Ed Turner (L) 739

Morris:
(incumbent)Warner Jorgenson (PC) 3650
Lawrence Lewco (NDP) 1602
Norm Dashevsky (L) 825

Osborne:
(incumbent)Ian Turnbull (NDP) 3945
June Westbury (L) 2347
Ted Speers (PC) 2344

Pembina:
(incumbent)George Henderson (PC) 4408
Robert McKenzie (L) 1553
Paul Klassen (NDP) 1013

Portage la Prairie:
(incumbent)Gordon Johnston (L) 2628
George Fairfield (PC) 2592
Albert Barrett (NDP) 1933

Radisson:
(incumbent)Harry Shafransky (NDP) 4267
Abe Kovnats (PC) 3635
D'Arcy Pagan (L) 1740

Rhineland:
Arnold Brown (PC) 2903
(incumbent)Jacob Froese (SC) 1587   
Jake Heinrichs (NDP) 1002
Harry Friesen (L) 578
John Epp (Ind) 52

Riel:
(incumbent)Donald Craik (PC) 7944
Wilson Parasiuk (NDP) 6181
Art Gill (L) 1782

River Heights:
(incumbent)Sidney Spivak (PC) 5167   
Charles Huband (L) 2906   
Muriel Smith (NDP) 1413

Roblin:
(incumbent)Wally McKenzie (PC) 3388
John Oldham (NDP) 2779

Rock Lake:
(incumbent)Henry Einarson (PC) 3470
Paul Cenerini (NDP) 1825
Arnold Collins (L) 1361

Rossmere:
(incumbent)Edward Schreyer (NDP) 6827  
Alfred Penner (PC) 6239

Rupertsland:
Harvey Bostrom (NDP) 2093
John Ateah (L) 1329
Raymond Guiboche (PC) 504
Dave Courchene Jr. (Ind) 415
Lorne Lester (Ind) 166

St. Boniface:
J. Paul Marion (L) 4301
(incumbent)Laurent Desjardins (NDP) 4300

St. George:
(incumbent)Bill Uruski (NDP) 3552
Elman Guttormson (L) 2465

St. James:
George Minaker (PC) 4483
(incumbent)Alvin Mackling (NDP) 4109
Michael Scholl (L) 1340
Gerald Zucawich (Ind) 30

St. Johns:
(incumbent)Saul Cherniack (NDP) 4519
Murray Krovats (PC) 1686
Ben Karasinski (L) 1061
William Cecil Ross (Comm) 66   
Joe Smith (Ind) 45
Diane Waldman (M-L) 24

St. Matthews:
(incumbent)Wally Johannson (NDP) 3875
Einar Arnason (PC) 2492
Norm Kirton (L) 1365

Ste. Rose:
(incumbent)A.R. Pete Adam (NDP) 2627
Dwight Hopfner (L) 1748
Alf O'Loughlin (PC) 1516

Selkirk:
(incumbent)Howard Pawley (NDP) 4745
John Linney (PC) 3429

Seven Oaks:
(incumbent)Saul Miller (NDP) 6579
Carl Zawatsky (PC) 4921
Henry Froese (L) 1386

Souris-Killarney:
(incumbent)Earl McKellar (PC) 4669
John Bucklaschuk (NDP) 1557
Gordon Martin (L) 890

Springfield:
(incumbent)Rene Toupin (NDP) 3611
John Vaags (PC) 3245
Len Mendes (L) 694
Harry Meronek (Ind) 333

Sturgeon Creek:
(incumbent)Frank Johnston (PC) 6467
Laverne Lewycky (NDP) 2924
Marjorie Gillies (L) 1647
Dale Hibbard (Ind) 54

Swan River:
(incumbent)James Bilton (PC) 3370
Omar Lamb (NDP) 2669
Vic Mearon (L) 687

The Pas:
(incumbent)Ron McBryde (NDP) 3673
George Takashima (Ind) 1873

Transcona:
(incumbent)Russell Paulley (NDP) 6275
Phil Rizzuto (PC) 4151

Virden:
(incumbent)Morris McGregor (PC) 2981
Barry Forman (NDP) 1741
Duncan McDonald (L) 911

Wellington:
(incumbent)Philip Petursson (NDP) 4190
Brandson Thornson (PC) 2272
Neil Baker (Ind) 1165

Winnipeg Centre:
(incumbent)Bud Boyce (NDP) 3010
Bob Wilson (PC) 1520
Ken Arenson (L) 1092
Ed Storozuk (SC) 44

Wolseley:
(incumbent)Israel Asper (L) 3135 
Murdoch MacKay (NDP) 3131
Robert Steen (PC) 1807

Post-election changes

St. Boniface (election declared void), December 20, 1974:
Laurent Desjardins (NDP) 3711
J. Paul Marion (L) 3092
Paul Fredette (PC) 378

Wolseley (res. Israel Asper, March 1, 1975), June 25, 1975:
Robert Wilson (PC) 2072
D'Arcy McCaffery (L) 1870
Murdoch MacKay (NDP) 1815
J.M.A. Smith (Ind) 55

Crescentwood (election declared void, February 20, 1975), June 25, 1975:
Warren Steen (PC) 2780
Charles Huband (L) 2611
Harvey Patterson (NDP) 1987

Souris-Killarney (dec. Earl McKellar, April 18, 1976), November 7, 1976:
Sterling Lyon (PC) 4478
Jean Strath (L) 1272
Howard Nixon (NDP) 1073

See also
 List of Manitoba political parties

Manitoba
1973
1973 in Manitoba
June 1973 events in Canada